Dolph is an unincorporated community in Izard County, Arkansas, United States. Dolph has a post office with ZIP code 72528.

References

Unincorporated communities in Izard County, Arkansas
Unincorporated communities in Arkansas